The British Society of Cinematographers Award for Best Cinematography in a Theatrical Feature Film is an award given annually by the British Society of Cinematographers (BSC). It was first given in 1953, since 1976 a set of nominees is presented.

British cinematographer Roger Deakins holds the record of most wins in the category with seven, followed by Douglas Slocombe with five, Oswald Morris and Freddie Francis with four, and Freddie Young and Geoffrey Unsworth with three.

Winners and nominees

1950s

1960s

1970s

1980s

1990s

2000s

2010s

2020s

See also
Academy Award for Best Cinematography
BAFTA Award for Best Cinematography
ASC Award for Best Feature Cinematography
Critics' Choice Movie Award for Best Cinematography

References

Awards for best cinematography
Awards established in 1953
British film awards